Administration of Ryukyu( Island)s may refer to the following (historical) jurisdictions,
 
on the Ryukyu Islands in southern Japan :

 United States Civil Administration of the Ryukyu Islands
 Apostolic Administration of Ryukyus (now Roman Catholic Diocese of Naha)